Cowloop (copy-on-write loop driver) was a Linux kernel driver that allows read-only filesystems to be made writable using the kernel module cowloop.ko. Cowloop worked by writing modified blocks to a separate file known as a cowfile, which is created by using the cowdev command to associate a block device, such as a CD, to a writable file.

Cowloop is now largely deprecated in favor of the device-mapper snapshot target which provides the same functionality and is also integrated with LVM2 (Linux Logical Volume Manager version 2).

Cowloop provided a somewhat similar functionality to unionfs and the newer aufs, but operates on a block level instead of operating on a file system level.

It is free software released under the terms of the GNU General Public License v2 or later.

External links
 Official homepage
 Free Software Directory page for Cowloop

Third-party Linux kernel modules